Dachang Hui Autonomous County is a Hui autonomous county of Hebei province. It is under the administration of Langfang prefecture-level city, and was established in 1955. The Hui Muslim county of Dachang was subjected to slaughter by the Japanese in the Second Sino-Japanese War.

A Dachang Hui Imam, Ma Zhenwu, wrote a Qur'an translation into Chinese including Chinese characters and Xiao'erjing.

Administrative divisions
The county administers one subdistrict and five towns. The county also administers the Hebei Dachang High-tech Industrial Development Zone, which serves as a township-level division. These township-level divisions then administer 16 residential communities, and 105 administrative villages.

Geography 
The county is bounded by the Chaobai River, across from which is Tongzhou District in Beijing.

34.2% of the county is forested.

Climate

Demographics 
As of 2019, Dachang is home to about 27,400 Hui people, comprising approximately 20.45% of the county's population.

Economy 
As of 2019, Dachang's gross domestic product totaled ¥16.48 billion. The county's urban residents have an annual per capita disposable income of ¥45,044, and the county's rural residents have an annual per capita disposable income of ¥18,418.

Transportation 
A number of expressways pass through the county, including the Jingping Expressway, the Jingqin Expressway, the Beijing–Harbin Expressway, and the G95 Capital Area Loop Expressway.

Five passenger bus lines link Dachang to Beijing.

The Beijing–Tangshan intercity railway is planned to run through the county, but is still under construction as of 2021.

References

External links
 Dachang Hui Autonomous County government website

County-level divisions of Hebei
Enclaves and exclaves
Hui autonomous counties
Langfang